Lorenz Johannes Pezold (June 22, 1893 – October 22, 1957) was a Major League Baseball third baseman who played in 23 games for the Cleveland Naps during the 1914 season.

External links

1893 births
1957 deaths
Cleveland Naps players
Major League Baseball third basemen
Baseball players from Louisiana
Gadsden Steel Makers players
Ironton Nailers players
New Orleans Pelicans (baseball) players